Connie Keogh is an American politician and educator serving as a member of the Montana House of Representatives from the 91st district. Elected in November 2018, she assumed office on January 7, 2019.

Early life and education 
Keogh was born in Roscoe, Montana. She earned a Bachelor of Science degree in education from the Montana University System and a Master of Education from Western Governors University.

Career 
Keogh has worked as a science teacher. After earning her master's degree, she worked as a student mentor and program director at WGU. She was elected to the Montana House of Representatives in November 2018 and assumed office on January 7, 2019.

References 

Living people
Year of birth missing (living people)
Western Governors University alumni
Women state legislators in Montana
Democratic Party members of the Montana House of Representatives
People from Carbon County, Montana
21st-century American women